Brad Pearce may refer to:

 Brad Pearce (tennis) (born 1966), American tennis player
 Brad Pearce (footballer) (born 1971), Australian rules footballer

See also
Bradley Pierce (born 1982), American actor